Benny Ibarra de Llano known as Benny Ibarra  is a Mexican singer, musician, producer and actor. He was born into a family of artists. His mother, Julissa, was a singer and actress in the 1960s; and his father, Benny, an actor and 1960s rock singer in the Mexican band Los Yaki. His brother, Alejandro Ibarra, is a singer and actor.

Ibarra started his music career in the pop band Timbiriche (1981), and began working as a solo artist in 1992. He reunited with Timbiriche for the 1999 Reunion and again for the 25th Anniversary Tour in 2007- 2008. Additionally he was part of trio that consisted of 3 former members of the Mexican pop group Timbiriche, consisting of Sasha Sokol, Benny Ibarra and Erik Rubin Sasha, Benny y Erik that formed in 2012-2016. 
In 2017, Benny joined the original founding members of Timbiriche (current line up includes original members Sasha Sokol, Benny Ibarra, Alix Bauer, Erik Rubin, Mariana Garza and Diego Schoening) to celebrate the 35th anniversary of the group. The tour will continue into 2018.

Pre-solo career
As part of Timbiriche, he recorded 7 albums. He also starred in Vaselina (Grease). Ibarra left Timbiriche in 1986, and from 1985 to 1989 he studied jazz, guitar, classical music, and composition at the Walnut Hill School in Boston. In 1998, Timbiriche reunited to tour  Mexico and Central America, and in 1999 released a live album El Concierto. Ibarra recorded the album Mar Adentro en la Sangre with Guadalajara-based progressive rock band Santa Sabina the same year.

Solo discography 
1992 Hablame Como La Lluvia
The first album includes the singles Dame un Poco de tu Amor and Tonto Corazón.
1994 El Tiempo
The second album went platinum and included the hits Sin Tí, Cielo and Mía. All of them became number one hits in Latin America.
1996 Om
On this third album, Benny wrote more songs about himself, but it was not the commercial success of its predecessor. The singles were Cada Mañana, Mas de Tí and Sutil Dolor.
2001 Todo O Nada
After a five-year absence, this album featured collaborations with Erik Rubin, Alix Bauer, Dougie Bowne and musicians from Café Tacuba and Alex González from the Mexican Rock band Maná. The first single Uno was top of the charts for eight weeks, became a gold record in two weeks and later went to platinum. the second single was Inspiraciòn, also included in the film soundtrack of same name.
2002 Grandes Exitos: 1992-2002
His first Greatest Hits release included a new single Irremediable from the film soundtrack La Habitación Azul, a duet with Edith Màrquez entitled La Otra, a new version of Cielo, live tracks and his chart hits. A limited edition CD included a DVD with 9 video clips. The first edition included Como un Ángel and the second Cielo 2002. The compilation became a gold record.
2003 Llueve Luz
This album went gold and was made with Chetes and Miguel Bosé, among others. Miguel Bosé sings on the second single Si Puedo Volverte a ver. The other singles were Llueve Luz and Vives en Mì.
2003 Cielo
A "best of" compilation for the US market.
2005 Así
His most recent album in the studio went gold in 48 hours and includes the singles Cada Paso and Dejalo Ir. A limited edition includes a digipack with DVD bonus with the music video of Cada Paso, and extras such as the making of the record.
2006 Estoy
A live album recorded in the Auditorio Nacional during November 2005, which includes "Tonto Corazòn" and a new track, "Siempre Mas", and other live songs from 1996 and 2002.
2006 Sus Baladas
2010  La Marcha de la Vida 
Includes the hit song "Calaveras" featuring Mexican/American singer songwriter Lila Downs and the first single "Perder Para Encontrar". In 2011, it was reissued with new songs and a DVD with videos and a documentary.

Music DVD 
 2003   En Vivo 
The DVD captures his first Auditorio Nacional show in 2002, though the concert is not complete. Included are features on his father, Moderatto, Erik Rubin and Alix Bauer
2006 Estoy
This DVD captures his 2005 concert in Auditorio Nacional, and also includes two videos, "Tonto Corazon 2006" and "Siempre Mas".

Filmography

See also
Sasha, Benny y Erik

External links 
 

Living people
Mexican male singers
Mexican people of Basque descent
Singers from Mexico City
Timbiriche members
Male actors from Mexico City
1970 births